Ulitsa Dmitrievskogo is a station on the Nekrasovskaya line of the Moscow Metro. It was opened on 3 June 2019 as a part of the inaugural stretch of the line, between Kosino and Nekrasovka.

In the initial stages of development, the projected name of the station was Saltykovskaya Street. In September 2014, the committee responsible for naming municipal buildings established the name as Ulitsa Dmitrievskogo. The station's namesake street was named for First Lieutenant Boris Dmitriyevsky, who was named a Hero of the Soviet Union for his actions in World War II.

References

Moscow Metro stations
Railway stations in Russia opened in 2019
Nekrasovskaya line